Worthing High School is a secondary school with academy status located in Worthing, West Sussex. It caters for academic years 7-11 (ages 11–16) and has over 950 students on roll.

History
The school has its origins as the Bedford Row Pupil teacher centre, a private school for girls, in January 1905. Within two years, it also took school leavers other than pupil teachers. The school was taken over by the local council in 1909, moving to its current site in 1914. It operated at a girls school on this site, with a junior house in Shelly Road between 1918 and 1930, apart from an evacuation to New Ollerton, Nottinghamshire in 1941, until it became a girls' grammar school under the changes of the Education Act 1944.
It remained as a grammar school until the local authority reorganised provision in the town along three-tier comprehensive lines in 1973, when it became a girls' comprehensive high school for students aged 12 to 16. At this time it became known as Gaisford girls' high school.
The school became co-educational in 1982 when it merged with West Tarring Secondary School for boys, then becoming known by its current name.

In 2008, the school became a Trust school under the rules of the Education and Inspections Act 2006. The school converted to academy status in December 2012. From 2015 it became a standard secondary school accepting its first cohort of Year 7 students since the 1973 reorganisation following the change in the age of transfer in Worthing. The school has been rated "good" with outstanding areas on its previous  OFSTED inspection in April 2016.

Notable alumni

Anita Roddick - Founder of The Body Shop.
Simon Mayo - English radio presenter and author.

References

External links
Worthing High School official website

Gallery

Secondary schools in West Sussex
Buildings and structures in Worthing
Educational institutions established in 1905
Academies in West Sussex
1905 establishments in England